Vladimir Ivanov or Volodymyr Ivanov may refer to:

Sportspeople
Vladimir Ivanov (badminton) (born 1987), Russian badminton player
Vladimir Ivanov (boxer) (born 1936), Soviet boxer who competed at the 1972 Summer Olympics
Vladimir Ivanov (footballer, born 1973), Bulgarian football player
Vladimir Ivanov (motorcyclist) (born 1983), Russian motorcycle racer
Volodymyr Ivanov (skier), Ukrainian cross-country skier, biathlete, sighted guide and Paralympian
Vladimir Ivanov (speed skater) (born 1949), Soviet speed skater
Vladimir Ivanov (sprinter) (1955–2020), Bulgarian sprinter
Vladimir Ivanov (tennis) (born 1987), Estonian tennis player
Volodymyr Ivanov (volleyball) (born 1940), Ukrainian volleyball player who competed for the Soviet Union
Vladimir Ivanov (footballer, born 1976), Russian football player

Politicians 

 Vladimir Valeryevich Ivanov (born 1971), Russian politician
 Vladimir Ivanov (politician) (1893–1938), Uzbek SSR leader
 Volodymyr Ivanov (politician) (born 1982), member of the parliament of Ukraine, 2019–2023

Others
Vladimir Ivanov (engineer) (1920-1996), Russian radio engineer
Vladimir Ivanov (filmmaker) (born 1945), Russian filmmaker, director of Moscow Pride '06
Vladimir Ivanov (model) (born 1988), Russian-American model
Vladimir Ivanov (orientalist) (1886–1970), Russian orientalist
Vlad Ivanov (born 1969), Romanian actor, known for 4 Months, 3 Weeks and 2 Days